Shaun Gregory is a British businessman, former CEO of BTI Studios, and is currently serving as Chief Executive Officer of Iyuno Media Group.

Education 

1985-1988: Nottingham College
 1999-2000: Wharton Business School
 2001: Ashridge Business School (part of Hult International Business School)

Career
Prior to serving as CEO of Iyuno Media Group, Gregory was CEO at BTI Studios. On 12 September 2019 BTI Studios and Iyuno Media Group announced the merge of the two companies, who became one under the Iyuno Media Group brand.

Gregory was CEO at Exterion Media providing leadership for their operations, setting the strategic direction and framework for their growth. He was also Managing Director of Telefónica Digital’s global advertising business, providing leadership to new, developing and established media businesses across the globe. Prior to this role Gregory worked with the UK Executive team to help transform O2 from a ‘pure play’ Telco into a leading connectivity service brand, widely acknowledged as the leader amongst its peer group in the UK. Gregory also underpinned the launch of Priority Moments in the UK, now rolled out into other countries across Telefónica.

Prior to this Gregory was Chief Executive of Blyk. He worked alongside Pekka Ala-Pietilä, the former president of Nokia to launch the world's first advertiser funded mobile network. He was also responsible for the strategy and fundraising of the UK business. Before moving into mobile, he was Director of New media at Telegraph Media Group where he is widely credited for spearheading the transformation of The Telegraph from a newspaper into a fully integrated 24/7 multimedia group. Telegraph Media Group won a range of Awards and is widely credited as a leader of change within the newspaper industry.

Additional affiliations and memberships 
Alongside his full-time executive role at Telefónica, Gregory has participated in a number of early stage, start up and interesting businesses. He has been a Non-Executive Director on many Boards, including WEVE, Telefónica's WAYRA, Ocean Outdoor, Bliss Media and Proxama. He has also served on a number of Trade Bodies, including the Advertising Association and has help shape advertising policy in the UK.

References 

English chief executives
Living people
Hult International Business School alumni
Year of birth missing (living people)